William H. Surles (24 February 1845 - 19 March 1919) was a private in the United States Army who was awarded the Medal of Honor for gallantry during the American Civil War. Surles was awarded the medal on 19 August 1891 for actions performed at the Battle of Perryville in Kentucky on 8 October 1862.

Personal life 
Surles was born in Steubenville, Ohio on 24 February 1845, the son of John and Emily Surles and one of two children. He married Sara J. Allen and fathered one child. After the war, he worked as a coal dealer and a postmaster (13 years) in East Liverpool, Ohio and served as department commander of the Ohio G.A.R. in 1916. He died in East Liverpool on 19 March 1919 and was buried in Riverview Cemetery in East Liverpool.

Military service 
Surles enlisted in the Army on 5 September 1861 at Steubenville, Ohio and was assigned to Company G of the 2nd Ohio Infantry. On 8 October 1862, at the Battle of Perryville, Surles' regiment was overwhelmed by a large Confederate force. In the chaos, Surles noticed a Confederate soldier taking aim through a musket at Colonel Anson G. McCook, the commander of the 2nd, who had just had his horse shot out from under him. Surles jumped in front of the colonel, intending to take the bullet, but the Confederate soldier was killed before he could fire and Surles and the colonel escaped uninjured.

Surles' Medal of Honor citation, describing this action, reads:

Surles was mustered out of the Army on 10 October 1864.

References

1845 births
1919 deaths
American Civil War recipients of the Medal of Honor
People from Steubenville, Ohio
Union Army soldiers